Tállya Községi Sportegyesület is a professional football club based in Tállya, Borsod-Abaúj-Zemplén County, Hungary, that competes in the Nemzeti Bajnokság III, the third tier of Hungarian football.

Name changes
1959–90: Tállyai Építők
1990–present:Tállya KSE

Season results
As of 6 August 2017

External links
 Official website of Tállya KSE
 Profile on Magyar Futball

References

Football clubs in Hungary
Association football clubs established in 1952
1952 establishments in Hungary